Sylviane Telliez (née Marotel; born 30 October 1942) is a former French track and field who competed in short sprints. She dominated French sprinting in the first half of the 1970s. She was a four-time medallist in the 60 metres at the European Athletics Indoor Championships from 1970 to 1974. She was also a 100 m finalist at the 1969 European Athletics Championships.

She was born in Épinay-sur-Seine and ran for Racing Club de France during her career. She was a three-time participant at the Summer Olympics for France (1968, 1972, and 1976). She broke the world record for the 300 metres in 1968 to 1969 with her hand-timed runs of 37 seconds and 36.5 seconds. She was a former holder of the European indoor record for the 50 metres with her best of 6.24 seconds. She held the French record over 100 metres for a total of eight years, including breaking the mark times in 1972 (11.01s), and the 200 metres for two years with her best of 23.08. She was also a national record holder indoors in the 50 m (6.31 seconds) and 60 metres (7.27 in 1974).

International competitions
   European champion Indoors 50m in 1968 (in Madrid ) 
   European champion in the relay 1 + 2 + 3 + 4 laps 1970
   European Indoors champion in the relay 4 × 200   m 1969 
   Gold Medal 100m  at the Mediterranean Games in 1967
  Second in European Indoors Champion  60m in 1969, 1970 and 1971
  Third in European Indoors Champion  60m in 1972 and 1973

National titles
French Athletics Championships
100 m: 1968, 1969, 1970, 1971, 1972, 1973, 1974, 1975
200 m: 1967, 1969, 1970, 1971, 1972, 1973
French Indoor Athletics Championships
60 m: 1972, 1973, 1975 and 1976

References

Living people
1942 births
Sportspeople from Épinay-sur-Seine
French female sprinters
Olympic athletes of France
Athletes (track and field) at the 1968 Summer Olympics
Athletes (track and field) at the 1972 Summer Olympics
Athletes (track and field) at the 1976 Summer Olympics
Mediterranean Games gold medalists for France
Mediterranean Games medalists in athletics
Athletes (track and field) at the 1967 Mediterranean Games
Olympic female sprinters